Busuu is an unclassified Southern Bantoid language of Cameroon. According to Ethnologue it is extinct. As of 2005 there were 3 speakers of the language. Busuu is an endangered language.

Classification
In the Furu-Awa Subdivision in northern Cameroon bordering to Nigeria, three missions of ALCAM (Atlas Linguistique du Cameroun) between 1984 and 1986 investigated three non-Jukunoid languages, among which Bikya and Bishuo are probably Beboid, but Busuu has been unable to be classified. All of these languages were spoken only by a few older inhabitants of the five villages Furu-Awa, (Furu-)Nangwa (Busuu-speaking), (Furu-)Turuwa, (Furu-)Sambari (Bishuo-speaking) and Furubana (Bikya-speaking). Lexical analysis has shown that while Bishuo has 24% lexical similarity with neighbouring Beboid languages, Nsaa and Nooni and Bikya have 16% resp. 17% similarity with them, and Busuu has just 8% resp. 7%.

See also
Busuu (an online network named after the Busuu language)

External links 
 Multimedia Site about Busuu with a song sung in this language

Notes 

Furu languages
Endangered Niger–Congo languages
Endangered languages of Africa